Once Upon a Time in Venezuela is a 2020 Venezuelan documentary film directed by . It was selected as the Venezuelan entry for the Best International Feature Film at the 93rd Academy Awards, but it was not nominated.

Synopsis
Villagers around Lake Maracaibo deal with corruption and pollution which threatens their homes.

See also
 List of submissions to the 93rd Academy Awards for Best International Feature Film
 List of Venezuelan submissions for the Academy Award for Best International Feature Film

References

External links
 

2020 films
2020 documentary films
Venezuelan documentary films
2020s Spanish-language films
Documentary films about Venezuela